People named Custine include:
Adam Philippe, Comte de Custine (1740-1793), French general
Astolphe-Louis-Léonor, Marquis de Custine (1790-1857), French aristocrat and writer